Duniway Park is a  public park in southwest Portland, Oregon. The space was acquired in 1918.

References

1918 establishments in Oregon
Athletics (track and field) venues in Oregon
Parks in Portland, Oregon
Protected areas established in 1918
Soccer venues in Oregon